Copadichromis geertsi is a species of haplochromine cichlid which is endemic to Lake Malawi.

Description
The males are dark in colour with the upper body varying from light blue to yellow towards the head and on the dorsal fin. It can be distinguished from other members of the genus Copadichromis by the two spots,  the colour of the breeding males being black with a pale blue to yellow flash on its head and back. The females and non-breeding males do not have the yellow colour in the anal fin seen females and non breeding males of the otherwise similar Copadichromis pleurostigmoides  and they are grey in colour with two black spots.

Distribution
Copadichromis geertsi is endemic to Lake Malawi along the eastern shore from the Nsinje River in Malawi) north as far as Thundu in Mozambique. It has only been recorded from four sites.

Habitat and ecology
The females are sometimes found foraging in groups in open water and single individual females will move between the territories held by the breeding males. This species feeds on small items that it takes from the water column.

The breeding males excavate cave crater spawning sites in the mixed habitat below . The territorial male digs out the sand from underneath the rock, piling it up and using it to construct a semicircular wall which surrounds the spawning site. The breeding males normally space their spawning sites  from each other. 

After the females have mated they mouthbrood the fertilised eggs for 30–36 days  and when they are ready they move into shallow water where join the schools of juvenile utaka which are frequently found above nests of kampango (Bagrus meridionalis), where they release the free swimming fry.

Human usage
Copadichromis geertsi is found in the aquarium trade, where it is sometimes called "Virginialis blotch". They have been bred in captivity but wild caught adults are still available. Overfishing using open-water seine nets, of a type called "chirimila nets" in Lake Malawi, is potentially a threat to this species.

Etymology
This species was named in 1999 by the Dutch ichthyologist and cichlid specialist Ad Konings, in its specific name he honours Martin Geerts of the Dutch Cichlid Association in recognition of his scientific knowledge of cichlids and for the support he gave to Konings during a number of expeditions to Lakes Malawi and Tanganyika.

References

geertsi
Taxa named by Ad Konings
Fish described in 1999
Taxonomy articles created by Polbot
Fish of Lake Malawi
Fish of Malawi
Fish of Mozambique